The vice president is elected indirectly, by an electoral college consisting of members (elected as well as nominated) of both Houses of Parliament, by the system of proportional representation using single transferable votes and the voting is by secret ballot. The election of the vice president is slightly different from the election of the president as the members of state legislatures are not part of the electoral college but the nominated members of Rajya Sabha are part of it.

Electoral college results

See also
 Elections in India
 Electoral College
 List of Indian presidential elections
 List of Rajya Sabha elections
 List of Indian general elections
 List of Indian state legislative assembly elections

External links
 Vice Presidential Elections
 Vice President of India
 Former Vice Presidents of India

References

India
Elections in India
Vice-presidential elections in India
India politics-related lists